Song Yun was a Chinese Buddhist monk who was sent by the pious Buddhist Empress Hu (?-528 CE) of the Northern Wei Dynasty with other monastic companions including Hui Zheng, Fa Li and Zheng (or Wang) Fouze, to northwestern India to search for Buddhist texts. They left the Wei capital Luoyang, on foot in 518 and returned in the winter of 522 with 170 Buddhist scriptures.

The Voyage
Song Yun, who was originally from Dunhuang, and one of his companions, Hui Zheng, both wrote accounts of their journey, but they have since disappeared. Song Yun took the Qinghai Route via Xining, past Qinghai Lake and through the Qaidam depression, probably joining the main Southern Silk Route near Shanshan/Loulan. The route at the time was under the control of the Tuyuhun (Tibetan: 'Azha) people.

Fortunately, much valuable information about their journey has been preserved in the Loyang Jielanji of Yang Xianzhi and other texts. There are some minor discrepancies among the surviving sources as to the exact dates of the journey and the names of the people who made the trip together, but Édouard Chavannes believes it is possible to work out the itinerary with some confidence.

"Hui Zheng [and the others] were sent in the 11th day of the second month of the second Zhengui year (518); he and his companions arrived in Karghalik on the 29th day of the 7th month of the 2nd Zhengui year (519); in the second ten days of the ninth month, they met the king of the Hephthalites; at the beginning of the 11th month, they arrived in Bosi or Boji (southwest of Wakhan); in the second ten days of this same month, they entered Chitral and at the beginning of the 12th month they entered Udyana. Then, during the second ten days of the fourth month of the first Chengkuang year (520), they arrived in Gandhara. They stayed two years in Udyana and Gandhara until returning at the beginning of the third Chengkuang year (522), (and not the second year as one reads in the Account)." According to legend, they returned through the Congling (or "Onion") Mountains where Song Yun met the celebrated Damo or Bodhidharma who had died recently at Luoyang.

They seem to have travelled to India along the difficult southern branch of the Silk Routes from Dunhuang to Yutian (Khotan) along the edge of the Taklamakan Desert, to the north of the Congling Mountains, and then, like Fa Xian had done previously, crossed the mountains. After passing through Wakhan, they met with the King of the Hephthalites, who had taken over the lands previously controlled by the Yuezhi and had recently conquered Gandhara.  He was apparently on tour at the time near the entrance to the Wakhan Corridor and not at his capital city Badiyan (Bâdhaghìs) which was near modern Herat in western Afghanistan.  The king, who had control over more than forty kingdoms, prostrated twice and received an Imperial edict from the Northern Wei Dynasty on his knees.

Song Yun and his companions then travelled through Chitral and met the kings of the Swat Valley or Udyana.

See also
 Buddhism in China
 Silk Road transmission of Buddhism
 Xuanzang
 Yijing
 Faxian
 Hyecho
 Great Tang Records on the Western Regions
 A Record of Buddhist Practices Sent Home from the Southern Sea
 Wang ocheonchukguk jeon (往五天竺國傳)
 Fa Hien Cave

Footnotes

References
 
  - Total pages: 379-441 (Read on JStor).

External links
 "A Lesser Known Route: the Qinghai Route." 

Northern and Southern dynasties translators
Sanskrit–Chinese translators
Northern Wei Buddhist monks
Year of death unknown
People from Jiuquan
Writers from Gansu
Ancient history of Afghanistan
Ancient history of Pakistan
Year of birth unknown
Northern Wei writers
6th-century Chinese translators
Chinese explorers
Explorers of India